Christophe Maraninchi (born February 17, 1983) is a former French professional footballer.

He played on the professional level in Swiss Super League for Neuchâtel Xamax. He also played with Xamax in the 2005 UEFA Intertoto Cup, scoring one goal against FC Ararat Yerevan and one against AS Saint-Étienne.

External links
 

1983 births
Living people
Association football midfielders
French footballers
French expatriate footballers
Expatriate footballers in Switzerland
Swiss Super League players
Championnat National players
Championnat National 2 players
Gazélec Ajaccio players
Neuchâtel Xamax FCS players
SC Toulon players